The London Midland and Scottish Railway (LMS) Fowler Class 4F is a class of 0-6-0 steam locomotive designed for medium freight work. They represent the ultimate development of Midland Railway's six coupled tender engines. Many trainspotters knew them as "Duck Sixes", a nickname derived from their wheel arrangement.

Background 
The 4F was based on the 197-strong Midland Railway 3835 Class of 1911, with only a few modifications, primarily the adoption of left-hand drive instead of right-hand drive. They originally had been designed by Henry Fowler, who from 1925 became CME of the LMS.

Midland Railway locomotives were notorious for their short axle-box bearings, which were prone to overheating. This design feature was perpetuated in the LMS 4F. The problem was eventually solved with the fitting of mechanical lubricators.

Construction 

The LMS constructed 530 of the locomotives between 1923 and 1928, numbered sequentially from where the Midland engines left off from 4027. A further 45 examples were reluctantly authorised by William Stanier in 1937 at the behest of the operating department.

The missing numbers (4)4557–61 relate to five locomotives built for the Somerset and Dorset Joint Railway to the Midland Railway 3835 Class design in 1922, and taken into LMS stock in 1930.

All entered British Railways stock in 1948. BR added 40000 to their numbers. They were all withdrawn between 1959 and 1966.

Accidents and incidents
On 12 February 1929, locomotive No. 4491 was hauling a freight train that was in a head-on collision with an express passenger train at  station, Derbyshire due to a signalman's error. Two people were killed.
On 6 June 1961, a locomotive of the class was running light when it was in a head-on collision with a freight train at  station, Cumberland.

Withdrawal 
Withdrawals from stock occurred between 1959 and 1966.

Preservation 

Three LMS-built 4Fs survive, with the first-built LMS 4F, No. (4)4027, being part of the National  Collection.  In addition, one Midland 4F, No. (4)3924 has also survived.

Models 
The 4F has been modelled by Lima (O, HO and N Gauge) and Graham Farish (N Gauge, still produced under the Bachmann label). Airfix produced a tender drive model of the 4F in OO Gauge in 1978. Production of this was continued by Dapol after it acquired Airfix models in 1985, and were subsequently sold to Hornby in the late 1990s. They upgraded the model to loco drive in 2012. Bachmann have produced a version of the Midland railway variant of the 4F since 2012.

References

Sources
 David Hunt, John Jennison Bob Essery & Fred James LMS Locomotive Profiles No.10: The Standard Class 4 Goods 0-6-0s  (pictorial supplement )

External links 

 London Midland Society 4123
 Class 4F-C Details at Rail UK

0-6-0 locomotives
4F
Andrew Barclay locomotives
Kerr Stuart locomotives
NBL locomotives
Railway locomotives introduced in 1924
Standard gauge steam locomotives of Great Britain
Freight locomotives